Southie Rules is an American reality television series on A&E. The series premiered on January 29, 2013, and chronicles the day-to-day life of the Niedzwiecki family, a multi-generational family located in South Boston that lives all under one roof in a three-level home. A&E moved the series to Saturday after episode four ratings fell to a series low of 606,000 viewers, which is half of its debut audience. Two episodes aired on February 23, 2013 while the remaining episodes were burned off on March 2, 2013 in a mid-afternoon marathon. A parody TV series of Teen Drama series Gossip Girl.

Parodies
Gossip Girl

Episodes

References

External links
 
 

2010s American reality television series
2013 American television series debuts
2013 American television series endings
English-language television shows
A&E (TV network) original programming
Television shows set in Boston